This is a list of candidates for the 1869–70 New South Wales colonial election. The election was held from 3 December 1869 to 10 January 1870.

There was no recognisable party structure at this election.

Retiring Members
Marshall Burdekin MLA (East Sydney)
Theophilus Cooper MLA (New England)
Leopold De Salis MLA (Queanbeyan)
Phillip Dignam MLA (Argyle)
Hugh Gordon MLA (Tenterfield)
James Hannell MLA (Newcastle)
James Hart MLA (East Sydney)
Robert Isaacs MLA (Yass Plains)
Robert Landale MLA (Murray)
John Lang MLA (West Sydney)
John Lloyd MLA (Liverpool Plains)
Samuel Lyons MLA (Central Cumberland)
George McKay MLA (Orange)
James Oatley MLA (Canterbury)
Richard Roberts MLA (Camden)
James Rodd MLA (Goldfields South)
Thomas Smart MLA (Glebe)
Robert Stewart MLA (East Sydney)
Barnard Stimpson MLA (Carcoar)
Atkinson Tighe MLA (Northumberland)

Legislative Assembly
Sitting members are shown in bold text. Successful candidates are highlighted.

Electorates are arranged chronologically from the day the poll was held. Because of the sequence of polling, some sitting members who were defeated in their constituencies were then able to contest other constituencies later in the polling period. On the second occasion, these members are shown in italic text.

See also
 Members of the New South Wales Legislative Assembly, 1869–1872

References
 

1869-70